Paul-Yves Nizan (7 February 1905 – 23 May 1940) was a French philosopher and writer.

He was born in Tours, Indre-et-Loire and studied in Paris where he befriended fellow student Jean-Paul Sartre at the Lycée Henri IV. He became a member of the French Communist Party, and much of his writing reflects his political beliefs, although he resigned from the party soon after the Molotov–Ribbentrop Pact in 1939. He died in the Battle of Dunkirk, fighting against the German army in World War II.

His works include the novels Antoine Bloye (1933), Le Cheval de Troie [The Trojan Horse] and La Conspiration [The Conspiracy] (1938), as well as the essays "Les Chiens de garde" ["The Watchdogs"] (1932) and "Aden Arabie" (1931), which introduced him to a new audience when it was republished in 1960 with a foreword by Sartre. In particular, the opening sentence "I was twenty, I won't let anyone say those are the best years of your life" (J’avais vingt ans. Je ne laisserai personne dire que c’est le plus bel âge de la vie.) became one of the most influential slogans of student protest during May '68.

Life
Nizan was born to a middle-class family, his father having worked in rail prior to the First World War. Nizan's father's course through the bureaucracy of French industry would later form the basis of Antoine Bloye, and serve as a significant point of development for Nizan's understanding of social alienation.

He interrupted his studies at the École Normale Supérieure of the University of Paris in 1926 to leave for Aden where he worked as tutor to the son of French-born businessman-millionaire Antonin Besse. He drew upon his six-month experience in Aden to write his first novella, Aden Arabie, published in 1931. Nizan then entered into a number of miscellaneous jobs around the French Communist Party (PCF), writing for its journal prominently and even, at one point, running a party bookshop in Paris. Nizan later took up a professorship teaching literature, during which time he took on a reputation among students as an affable and relaxed professor, sometimes even offering his students cigarettes during class. As a teacher, he was reticent about his own perspective on Marxist theory, instead encouraging his students to arrive independently at their own conclusions. Through this period, up to the onset of World War II, Nizan penned all of his major works, including "The Watchdogs", an exposé on materialist philosophy, and the novels Antoine Bloye and The Conspiracy.

In August 1939, he broke with the French Communist Party following the signing of the Molotov–Ribbentrop Pact. His motive was not a moral judgment against the USSR; on the contrary, he criticized the French Communist Party for having lacked cynicism:

Given his active participation in the anti-fascist movement, as well as his commitment to the republican cause of the Spanish Civil War, Nizan could not accept the party's rapid shift against the popular front. Soon thereafter, Nizan enlisted to fight in the French army with the onset of World War II, and was killed in action on 23 May 1940 at the Château de Cocove in Recques-sur-Hem, during the German offensive against Dunkirk.

Politics

Nizan's politics took a number of sporadic turns throughout the course of his life, with Sartre noting that Nizan in his youth had vacillated between fascist and communist sympathies, attracted to both extremes of the political spectrum. Nizan also approached the priesthood as a young man but soon turned away from that decision. Eventually, Nizan settled on membership in the French Communist Party, under whose auspices Nizan's public life as an author began. Within the party, Nizan wrote extensively for official communist publications and had his works sold in party bookstores, although his most celebrated work today is his fiction. In his various novels, Nizan explores modern alienation, as well as the situation of the radical petit-bourgeois milieu caught between contending class forces. While Nizan was a loyal adherent to the policies of the Communist Party, his writings anticipate elements of postwar radical existentialism, leaving the contemporary reader with an ambiguous image of Nizan's political standing.

Works 
 Aden Arabie (1931), (1960)
 Les Chiens de garde [The Watchdogs] (1932)
 Antoine Bloye (1933)
 Le Cheval de Troie [The Trojan Horse] (1938)
 La Conspiration [The Conspiracy] (1938)
 Morceaux choisis de Marx (1934) Introduction by Henri Lefebvre
 Chronique de septembre (1939)
 Paul Nizan, intellectuel communiste. Articles et correspondance 1926-1940 (1967)
 Pour une nouvelle culture (1971)
 Articles littéraires et politiques, volume I (2005)

See also 
Emmanuel Todd, his grandson

References

External links 
 La nature et l’anthropologie dans Antoine Bloyé de Paul Nizan 
 

1905 births
1940 deaths
Writers from Tours, France
20th-century French philosophers
École Normale Supérieure alumni
French Communist Party members
French military personnel killed in World War II
Prix Interallié winners
Lycée Henri-IV alumni
20th-century French novelists
French male essayists
Marxist writers
French male novelists
20th-century French essayists
French Army personnel of World War II